Levi Scott (October 11, 1802 – July 13, 1882) was an American bishop of the Methodist Episcopal Church, elected in 1852.

Birth, family and early life
Scott was born near Cantwell's Bridge, now Odessa, Delaware.  His parents were Methodists, his father a class-leader and local preacher who entered the Itinerant Ministry of the Philadelphia Annual Conference of the M.E. Church in 1803.  He died the following year.

He labored on a farm until his sixteenth year, when he began a mechanical occupation.  He was converted to Christ in 1822 and united with the church.

Ordained ministry
After great hesitation, and under a thorough conviction of duty, he accepted a license to preach in 1825.  The following year he was received into the Philadelphia Conference.

Scott was appointed, successively, to Talbot, Dover, St. George's Charge, Philadelphia, and West Chester.  In 1832, on account of impaired health, he received the supernumerary relation.  The following year he was able to resume his work.  In 1834, he was unexpectedly appointed Presiding Elder of the Delaware District.

Scott continued to fill pastoral charges until, in 1840, and at the earnest solicitation of Dr. Durbin, he accepted the position of principal of the Dickinson Grammar School, Carlisle, Pennsylvania.  He served in this position for three years before returning again to pastoral work, which was more to his taste.

Scott was elected a member of every General Conference of the M.E. Church from 1836 to 1852.  The 1848 General Conference elected him the assistant book agent of the Methodist Book Concern in New York City.

Episcopal ministry
After serving four years with the book concern, the Scott was elected to the episcopacy of the Methodist Episcopal Church by the 1852 General Conference.  As a bishop he traveled extensively through all the states and territories in which his denomination was active.  The year after his election, Bishop Scott sailed for Africa, visiting the missions on that coast and presiding at the session of the Liberia Annual Conference.  He also visited the conferences on the US Pacific Coast three times.  He was the senior bishop of the M.E. Church until his death, following the death of Bishop Thomas Asbury Morris in 1874.

See also

List of bishops of the United Methodist Church

References

 Cyclopaedia of Methodism, Matthew Simpson, D.D., LL.D., Ed., (Revised Edition.)  Philadelphia, Louis H. Everts, 1880, pp. 790–91.
 Leete, Frederick DeLand, Methodist Bishops.  Nashville, The Methodist Publishing House, 1948.

1802 births
1882 deaths
Bishops of the Methodist Episcopal Church
American Methodist bishops
People from New Castle County, Delaware
19th-century Methodist bishops
19th-century American bishops